Daniele De Luca (born: 10 April 1963) is a sailor from Verona, Italy. who represented his country at the 2000 Summer Olympics in Sydney, Australia as crew member in the Soling. With helmsman Nicola Celon and fellow crew member Michele Paoletti they took the 14th place.

References

Living people
1963 births
Sailors at the 2000 Summer Olympics – Soling
Olympic sailors of Italy
Sportspeople from Verona
Italian male sailors (sport)